Ethicon, Inc. is a subsidiary of Johnson & Johnson. It was incorporated as a separate company under the Johnson & Johnson umbrella in 1949 to expand and diversify the Johnson & Johnson product line.

Ethicon has manufactured surgical sutures and wound closure devices since 1887. After World War II, Ethicon's market share in surgical sutures rose from 15% to 70% worldwide. In the United States, the market share is approximately 80%.

Ethicon conducts business in 52 countries.

Corporate history

In 1915, George F. Merson opened a facility in Edinburgh for the manufacturing, packaging and sterilising of catgut, silk and nylon sutures. Johnson & Johnson acquired Mr. Merson's company in 1947, and this was renamed Ethicon Suture Laboratories. In 1953 this became Ethicon Inc.

In 1992, Ethicon was restructured, and Ethicon Endo-Surgery became a separate corporate entity.

In 2008, Ethicon sold its wound management business to One Equity Partners and became Systagenix Wound Management Limited.

In 2009, Ethicon acquired breast implant maker Mentor, and in 2010 it acquired ear, nose and throat technology company Acclarent. In 2016, Ethicon acquired NeuWave Medical.

In 2013, J&J merged Ethicon Endo-Surgery back into Ethicon.

Physiomesh class action lawsuits
On June 13, 2016, Health Canada issued a recall of Ethicon's Physiomesh Flexible Composite Mesh Product used for ventral hernia repair. The product had been on the Canadian market since September 2010 and patients claimed a range of complications following surgery. The proposed Canadian class action, filed June 1, 2017 is seeking court approval for certification as a class action and is expected to proceed in 2019.

Gynecare Prolift controversy
There is some controversy around Ethicon's transvaginal meshes used on patients with female genital prolapse.

Ethicon's Gynecare Prolift, was introduced in March 2005, bypassing FDA review. The company felt its basic polypropylene had already been approved and therefore it did not need to reapply for clearance for its Prolift kit. Three years later, when Ethicon tried to obtain clearance for its Prolift +M, the FDA was alerted to the fact that Prolift had been on the market. The agency approved the Prolift and Prolift +M with no penalty. Both were cleared through the Food and Drug Administrations 510(k) clearance process, that is clearance to sell. Ethicon's parent company Johnson & Johnson utilized the FDA's 510(k) clearance method, which allows a product to be sold without official FDA approval if it is based on another already approved product. However, in 2008, the FDA issued a Public Health Notification regarding reports of serious complications associated with transvaginal mesh devices. This escalated in 2011 when the agency received more than 1,000 adverse effect reports from surgical mesh manufacturers. The FDA decided to order Ethicon and other transvaginal mesh manufacturers to cease production until extensive testing and research on each of vaginal mesh device was conducted. In June 2012, following the FDA's order for additional testing, Johnson & Johnson permanently removed all Prolift products from the market.

In one court case reported by Reuters, the plaintiff, Dianne Bellew, on whom the product had been implanted in 2009, said she was never warned about how the device could contract and erode, causing pain and scarring.

References

Health care companies based in New Jersey
Companies based in Somerset County, New Jersey
Johnson & Johnson subsidiaries
Health care companies established in 1949
1949 establishments in New Jersey
Medical technology companies of the United States